Patigi Beach or Pategi Beach is a beach and tourist destination that is located along the River Niger in Pategi, Kwara State, in the middle belt of Nigeria.

Nigeria where the annual Pategi Regatta Festival and an assortment of fishing-related activities take place. It

History 

Vacationers have visited the beach since the Patigi Emirate was established.

Tourism 
Located along the Niger River, Patigi Beach is not a typical sandy beach; instead, its beauty lies in its rugged terrain. The beach is popular with fishing enthusiasts and fishermen. Many species of fish are found in the river, including whiting, flathead, and bream. 

The Pategi Regatta Festival boating event takes place annually and a pavilion complex has been constructed with facilities for visitors to enjoy the celebration.

Climate 
The weather typically consists of the rainy season, the dry season, and the Harmattan – the interlude between the two – which is characterised by dry winds.

Notes 

Boating lakes
Boat races
 Kwara State

Beaches of Nigeria